Yongning Town is a town in the Yanqing District of Beijing. It is a small town in rural Beijing but has a long history as an economic and military center. A government initiative in the 2000s to rehabilitate the town has restored its architectural landmarks. It is located to the south of Xiangying and Liubinbao Townships, west of Sihai and Jiuduhe Towns, north of Dazhuangke Township and Jingzhuang Town, and east of Shenjiaying and Jiuxian Towns. As of 2020, it had 23,483 residents under its administration.

The region was named Yongning in 1414 with the meaning of "Eternal Peace".

Geography 
Yongning Town is on the eastern part of Yanhuai Basin, with Xinhuaying River flowing pass the western portion of the town.

History
During the Ming dynasty it was an important military town, serving as the eastern command of the Xuanfu garrison area. There were 8,000 troops under the jurisdiction of Yongning town during that period. However, by the late Qing dynasty the town declined in importance. By the end of the Cultural Revolution in 1976, the cultural relics of the town's past were gone.

Administrative Divisions 
So far in 2021, Yongning Town is formed from 37 subdivisions, with 1 community and 36 villages. They are listed as follows:

Culture and tourism

The town has benefited from a government initiative in the 2000s to restore some of the glory of its condition during its Ming dynasty height. At the center of the town square is a tower. Yongning Catholic Church, a church tracing back to the Qing dynasty, stands today as a curious Gothic Revival architecture in contrast to the appearance of the rest of the town.

Gallery

See also
List of township-level divisions of Beijing

References 

Yanqing District
Towns in Beijing